Dr. James Emery served as a missionary in Guatemala with the Presbyterian Church, and was co-founder of the Theological Education by Extension movement there, and then taught at Missionary Internship (MI and CO) until his death in 1999.

Notes

Year of birth missing
1999 deaths
American Presbyterian missionaries
Presbyterian missionaries in Guatemala
American expatriates in Guatemala